In Greek mythology, Amyclas or Amyclus was a king of Sparta and the founder of Amyclae in central Laconia.

Mythology 
Amyclas was the son of King Lacedemon and Queen Sparta, and brother of Queen Eurydice of Argos. By Diomēdē, daughter of Lapithes, he became the father of Argalus, Cynortas, Hyacinth, Laodamia (or Leaneira), Harpalus, Hegesandre and possibly of Polyboea. In other versions of the myth, Amyclas was also called the father of Daphne.

Notes

References 

 Apollodorus, The Library with an English Translation by Sir James George Frazer, F.B.A., F.R.S. in 2 Volumes, Cambridge, MA, Harvard University Press; London, William Heinemann Ltd. 1921. ISBN 0-674-99135-4. Online version at the Perseus Digital Library. Greek text available from the same website.
Parthenius, Love Romances translated by Sir Stephen Gaselee (1882–1943), S. Loeb Classical Library Volume 69. Cambridge, MA. Harvard University Press. 1916.  Online version at the Topos Text Project.
Parthenius, Erotici Scriptores Graeci, Vol. 1. Rudolf Hercher. in aedibus B. G. Teubneri. Leipzig. 1858. Greek text available at the Perseus Digital Library.
Pausanias, Description of Greece with an English Translation by W.H.S. Jones, Litt.D., and H.A. Ormerod, M.A., in 4 Volumes. Cambridge, MA, Harvard University Press; London, William Heinemann Ltd. 1918. . Online version at the Perseus Digital Library
Pausanias, Graeciae Descriptio. 3 vols. Leipzig, Teubner. 1903.  Greek text available at the Perseus Digital Library.

External links

Princes in Greek mythology
Mythological kings of Sparta

Kings in Greek mythology
Laconian characters in Greek mythology
Laconian mythology